Fugu is a pufferfish and the dish prepared from it.

Fugu may also refer to:

 Fugu County, Shaanxi, China
Fugu Airport
 Fugu (software), an SFTP client
 Fugu Plan, a Japanese plan to re-settle European Jews in Asia
 Ghanaian smock or fugu, a plaid shirt
 Mehdi Zannad, aka Fugu, released an album with A Girl Called Eddy
 Fugu Furukawa, a Henchmen in Evil Genius 2 game.
 The Nexus Player, a digital media player developed by Google, codenamed fugu

See also
 Fugou County
 Fogou, a type of cave-like structure found in Cornwall
 Fuku (disambiguation)